Fenspiride (INN, brand names Eurespal, Pneumorel and others) is an oxazolidinone spiro compound used as a drug in the treatment of certain respiratory diseases. The pharmacotherapeutic classification is antitussives. In Russia it was approved for the treatment of acute and chronic inflammatory diseases of ENT organs (ear, nose, throat) and the respiratory tract (like rhinopharyngitis, laryngitis, tracheobronchitis, otitis and sinusitis), as well as for maintenance treatment of asthma. Russia, Romania, France and other European countries withdrew fenspiride-based drugs from the market due to the risk of QT prolongation and torsades de pointes. Fenspiride is known to have activity as an alpha-1 blocker.

References

2-Oxazolidinones
Alpha-1 blockers
Bronchodilators
Phenethylamines
Spiro compounds
Withdrawn drugs